was a Japanese politician of the Liberal Democratic Party (LDP), a member of the House of Representatives in the Diet (national legislature). A native of Sōka, Saitama and graduate of Waseda University, he was elected to the city assembly of Sōka in 1970 (serving for one term) and then to the first of his four terms as the mayor of Sōka in 1977. He was elected to the House of Representatives for the first time in 1993 as a member of the Japan New Party. After becoming a member of the New Frontier Party, he joined the LDP.

Imai died on 3 March 2023, at the age of 81.

References

External links 
 Official website in Japanese.

1941 births
2023 deaths
20th-century Japanese politicians
21st-century Japanese politicians
Members of the House of Representatives (Japan)
Mayors of places in Saitama Prefecture
Waseda University alumni
People from Sōka
Japanese municipal councilors
Politicians from Saitama Prefecture
Japan New Party politicians
New Frontier Party (Japan) politicians
Liberal Democratic Party (Japan) politicians